The Mission Hills Star Trophy is an annual, pro-celebrity golf tournament held in Hainan, China.

It has the largest individual prize purse of any golf tournament in Asia Pacific.

2010 inaugural tournament
This inaugural event was held between October 28–31, 2010. Japanese golfer Ryuji Imada won.

Notable entrants

Professional

Akashiya Sanma
Greg Norman
Sir Nick Faldo
Zhang Lian-wei
Colin Montgomerie
Hank Haney
Ryuji Imada
Lorena Ochoa
Annika Sörenstam
Se Ri Pak
Candie Kung
Belén Mozo
Rosie Jones

Celebrity

Catherine Zeta-Jones
Michael Phelps
Hugh Grant
Matthew McConaughey
Christian Slater
Li Ning
Akashiya Sanma
Ruud Gullit
Eric Tsang
Sammo Hung
Simon Yam
Michael Wong

See also
Mission Hills Golf Club
World Cup (men's golf)

References

External links
Official website

Golf tournaments in China
Celebrity competitions
Sport in Hainan
Recurring sporting events established in 2010
2010 establishments in China